José María Ruda (Buenos Aires, 1924 – Spain, 7 July 1994) was an Argentine jurist.

Between 1964 and 1972 he held a seat on the United Nations International Law Commission.
He also served as the Argentine ambassador to the United Nations between 1966 and 1970. He then served as a judge on International Court of Justice ("World Court") from 1973 to 1991. During this period he served as the president of the International Court of Justice between 1988 and 1991.

Biography 
He was born in Buenos Aires in 1924 and graduated from the University of Buenos Aires Faculty of Law in 1949. He obtained a Master of Laws in 1955 from New York University.

Publications (selection) 

 1976: Instrumentos internacionales, Tipográfica Editora Argentina, Buenos Aires
 1990: Presente y futuro del Tribunal Internacional de Justicia, Universidad de Granada.
 1994: Derecho internacional público, Tipográfica Editora Argentina, Buenos Aires.

References

1924 births
1994 deaths
20th-century Argentine judges
Argentine diplomats
Presidents of the International Court of Justice
International Law Commission officials
Permanent Representatives of Argentina to the United Nations
Argentine judges of United Nations courts and tribunals